Sou or SOU may refer to:

People
 Sou (surname), a Cantonese romanization of the Chinese surname Su
 Sō, a Japanese surname and given name

Culture
 Sou (French coin), various French coins, later called sous.
 Penny (Canadian coin), colloquially called a sou in Quebec
 Sou (album), studio album by Marcelo Camelo
 Sou (film), a film by Theodore Ushev for Shorts in Motion: The Art of Seduction
 Sou (pastry), a type of food pastry
 Southern Thai language, ISO 639-3 language code

SOU
 Special Operations Unit (disambiguation)
 Southampton Airport, England (IATA code SOU)
 Southampton Central railway station, England (National Rail code SOU)
 Southern Oregon University, United States
 Southern Railway (U.S.) (railroad reporting mark SOU)
 Statens offentliga utredningar, an official series of reports of committees appointed by the Swedish Government
 Sound of Urchin, American eclectic alternative rock band